Hanna or Hana is an Arabic Female given name (حنّا), common particularly among Arab Christians in Palestine, Lebanon, Syria and Egypt, deriving from the Syriac/Aramaic name for the Apostle John. In turn, the Syriac name is borrowed from Hebrew יוֹחָנָן (Yoḥānān) meaning God is gracious.

Notable people with the name include:

Given name

Hanna
 Hanna Abu-Hanna (1928–2022), Palestinian poet, writer and researcher
 Hanna Nasser (1936–2015), Palestinian politician
 Hanna Nasser (academic), Palestinian academic and political figure

Hana
 Hana Elhebshi, Libyan activist
 Hana Hajjar, Saudi cartoonist
 Hana Majaj (born 1982), Jordanian swimmer
 Hana Mareghni (born 1989), Tunisian judo practitioner
 Hana Nasser (born 1991), Israeli football player
 Hana Shalabi (born 1982), Palestinian prisoner in Israel
 Hana Shiha (born 1985), Egyptian actress
 Hana Sweid (born 1955), Israeli Arab politician

Middle name
 Stephan Hanna Stephan (1894–1949), a Christian Arab Palestinian writer

Surname 
 Jumana Hanna (born c. 1962), member of former prominent Iraqi family
 Lisa Hanna (born 1975), Jamaican politician and beauty queen, winner of the Miss World title in 1993
 Mil Hanna (born 1966), Lebanese-born Australian rules footballer
 Theodosios (Hanna) of Sebastia (born 1965), Palestinian Archbishop

References

Arabic masculine given names
Arabic feminine given names
Arabic-language surnames